Country Things is the tenth studio album by American country musician Granger Smith, released on September 25, 2020. Work on the album began in early 2019, but the death of Smith's 3-year-old son put the album on hold. When the COVID-19 pandemic hit, Smith was able to focus on writing songs again and completing the album. The first single from the album, "That's Why I Love Dirt Roads", was released in October 2019. The album was initially released as two individual discs, Country Things, Vol. 1 and Country Things, Vol. 2.

Background 
Granger Smith had begun writing songs for the album in the beginning of 2019. He was half-way done when tragedy struck. His 3-year-old son, River, died on June 6, 2019, after accidentally falling into the pool at their home, and everything was put on hold. It took nearly ten months before Smith started writing songs again, and when the COVID-19 pandemic further delayed the new album, he continued to write more songs. Instead of overloading the songs onto one album, the decision was made to split them up, eight songs on each album. Country Things Vol. 1 was released on September 25, 2020, with volume 2 released in November.

Inspiration 
Country Things Vol. 1 is a personal album for Smith, who after dealing with the tragedy of his son's death, said "it became about appreciating the gratefulness in the day without being overweighed by the worries of tomorrow." He wanted to focus on "the things you want to raise your kids with and find joy in. The country things." Songs on the album reflect not only his family values and deep introspection, but also Smith's penchant for fun. The track, "Country and Ya Know It", features an appearance by his alter ego, Earl Dibbles Jr.

Singles 
"That's Why I Love Dirt Roads" was released as a single on October 25, 2019, peaking at No. 50 on the Billboard Country Airplay chart in July 2020. The second single, "Hate You Like I Love You", was released February 8, 2021.

Track listing 
Volume 1

Volume 2

Personnel 
Adapted from AllMusic

Geoff Ashcroft – electric guitar
Eric Belz – keyboards, programming
Tyler Chiarelli – electric guitar
Dave Cohen – keyboards
Corey Crowder – programming, background vocals
Eric Darken – drums, percussion
Earl Dibbles Jr. – featured vocals on "Country and Ya Know It"
Kris Donegan – acoustic guitar
Kyle Fishman – keyboards, programming
Shannon Forrest – drums
Wes Hightower – background vocals
Mark Hill – bass guitar
Chad Jeffers – banjo
Mike Johnson – pedal steel guitar
Todd Lombardo – banjo, acoustic guitar, mandolin
Rachel Loy – bass guitar
Devin Malone – acoustic guitar, electric guitar, mandolin
John Marlin – acoustic guitar, electric guitar, mandolin, programming, synthesizer
Miles McPherson – drums, percussion
Katlin Owen – acoustic guitar, electric guitar
Hunter Phelps – background vocals
Jerry Roe – drums, percussion
Jason Kyle Saetveit – background vocals
Jordan Schmidt – percussion, background vocals
Jimmie Lee Sloas – bass guitar
Ernestine Smith – background vocals
Granger Smith – lead vocals, background vocals
London Smith – additional vocals
Bryan Sutton – acoustic guitar, ukulele
Lars Thorson – fiddle
Derek Wells – banjo, acoustic guitar, bass guitar, electric guitar, Hammond B-3 organ, mandolin, programming, slide guitar
Bryan David Willis – background vocals
Trent Willmon – electric guitar
Brad Winters – programming
Alex Wright – Hammond B-3 organ, keyboards, piano, programming, synthesizer

Charts

References 

2020 albums
Granger Smith albums
BBR Music Group albums